Atgaon is a railway station on the Central line of the Mumbai Suburban Railway network. Asangaon is the previous stop and Thansit is the next stop.

Atgaon translates to "eight villages" in Devangiri. It was the location of the DD serial Intezaar in 1991.

Railway stations in Thane district
Mumbai Suburban Railway stations
Mumbai CR railway division
Kalyan-Igatpuri rail line